Dudu may refer to:

Places
Dudu, Hormozgan, a village in South Khorasan Province, Iran
Dudu, South Khorasan, a village in South Khorasan Province, Iran
Dudu, Jammu and Kashmir, a village in Jammu and Kashmir, India
Dudu, Rajasthan, a tehsil and a panchayat samiti in Jaipur district, India
Dudu (Rajasthan Assembly constituency)
Dudu, a village in Chiajna Commune, Ilfov County, Romania
Dudu, a village in Plopii-Slăvitești Commune, Teleorman County, Romania
564 Dudu, a minor planet

People

Footballers
Dudu (footballer, born 1939), Olegário Tolóí de Oliveira, Brazilian midfielder and coach
Dudu (footballer, born 1980), Eduardo Francisco da Silva Neto, Brazilian forward
Dudu (footballer, born 1982), Carlos Eduardo Passos Farias, Brazilian midfielder
Dudu (footballer, born 17 April 1990), Luis Eduardo Chebel Klein Nunes, Brazilian defender
Dudu (footballer, born 21 April 1990), Luiz Eduardo dos Santos Gonzaga, Brazilian forward
Dudu (footballer, born 1992), Eduardo Pereira Rodrigues, Brazilian winger and attacking midfielder
Dudu (footballer, born 1993), Carlos Eduardo Bendini Giusti, Brazilian defender
Dudu (footballer, born 1996), Luiz Eduardo da Silva dos Santos, Brazilian forward
Dudu (footballer, born 1997), Luís Eduardo Marques dos Santos, Brazilian right back
Dudu (footballer, born 1998), Eduardo Feitoza Sampaio, Brazilian footballer
Dudu (German footballer) (born 1999), Eduardo dos Santos Haesler, German goalkeeper
Dudu (footballer, born August 1999), Luiz Eduardo Teodora da Silva, Brazilian midfielder
Dudu (footballer, born 2002), Eduardo Kempf Schwade, Brazilian left back
Dudu Aouate (born 1977), Israeli goalkeeper
Dudu Biton (born 1988), Israeli striker
Dudu Cearense (born 1983), Brazilian central midfielder
Dudu Dahan (born 1971), Israeli defender and manager
Dudu Doukara (born 1991), French-Senegalese footballer
Dudu Figueiredo (born 1991), Brazilian attacking midfielder
Dudu Georgescu (born 1950), Romanian footballer
Dudu Hatamoto (born 2003), Brazilian football forward
Dudu Mineiro (born 1985), Brazilian forward
Dudu Omagbemi (born 1985), Nigerian striker
Dudu Paraíba (born 1985), Brazilian left wingback
Dudu Twito (born 1994), Israeli left back
Eduardo da Silva (born 1983), Croatian footballer

Musicians
Dudu Aharon (born 1984), Israeli singer
Dudu do Banjo (born 1935), Brazilian guitar player and "king of banjo"
Dudu Elharar (born 1945), Israeli singer, music producer, actor and presenter
Dudu Fisher (born 1951), Israeli singer and stage performer
Dudu Nobre (born 1974), Brazilian composer and singer
Dudu Pukwana (1938–1990), South African saxophonist, composer and pianist
Dudu Tassa (born 1977), Israeli musician
Dudu Tucci (born 1955), Brazilian percussionist, singer and composer

Other people
Dudu of Akkad (fl. c. 21st century BC), king of Akkad
Dudu Duswara (–2020), Indonesian judge
Dudu Gerstein (born 1944), Israeli painter and sculptor
Dudu Geva (1950–2005), Israeli artist, writer, cartoonist, illustrator, and comic book creator
Dudu Karakaya (born 1985), Turkish middle-distance runner
Dudu Mentemu (1370–1433), Manchurian chieftain
Dudu Miyan (1819–1862), Indian militant leader
Dudu Mntowaziwayo Ndlovu (1957–1992), Zulu dancer
Dudu Myeni (born 1963), South African businesswoman
Dudu Topaz (1946–2009), Israeli comedian, actor, author and radio and television host
Dudu Zondo (born 1994), South African cricketer
Eduardo Dantas (born 1989), Brazilian bantamweight mixed martial arts fighter
Khandaker Rashiduzzaman Dudu (died 2014), Bangladeshi politician
Princess Dudu (born 1978), Nigerian taekwondo practitioner
Shamsul Alam Dudu (born 1957), Bangladeshi politician
Shamsuzzaman Dudu, Bangladeshi politician

Other uses
Dudu (album), by Turkish pop singer Tarkan
Dudu, a West German children's comedy film series also known as Superbug

See also
Doudou (disambiguation)
Dudus, nickname of Christopher Coke (born 1969), Jamaican drug lord and gang leader
Edu (disambiguation)
Eduardo, a given name (including a list of persons with the name)